Painter Hall (formerly the Physics Building) is an academic building located on the University of Texas at Austin campus. Named after Theophilus Painter, the building was constructed in 1933, expanded in 1957 and remodeled in 1974.

References

University of Texas at Austin campus
University and college buildings completed in 1933
1933 establishments in Texas